Live from the Woods at Fontanel is the first live album from Needtobreathe. Atlantic Records alongside Word Records released the album on April 14, 2015. It was Recorded on September 13, 2014 during the Rivers in the Wasteland Tour.

Critical reception

Specifying in a three and a half star review by AllMusic, Marcy Donelson recognizes, "Overall, while the track selection doesn't quite substitute for a greatest-hits collection, the album captures a strong live band delivering a clean, energetic performance (including revealing stage banter) that is certain to please fans and an absolute must for anyone interested in a souvenir of the tour." Alex Caldwell, indicating in a four and a half review from Jesus Freak Hideout, realizes, "They are quite simply a masterful live act." Mentioning in a five star review for New Release Tuesday, Christopher Thiessen reports, "whatever great things Needtobreathe has done in the past in the studio, they can and have done better live. Live From the Woods captures that perfectly... [where] every single song on the album is improved from its original." Andy Argyrakis, awarding the album four stars from CCM Magazine, describes, "this isn't Needtobreathe's most cleanly produced project, but the raw spontaneous feeling provides an accurate and engaging snapshot of what took place on the tour, while also allowing the group's redemptive lyrics to come across loud and clear." Rating the album four out of five stars at 365 Days of Inspiring Media, Joshua Andre declares, "Live From The Woods will definitely  me over until then, and maybe by some more!" Lauren McLean, awarding the album 4.5 out of five at Christian Music Review, writes, "This album is the best thing next to seeing them live." Giving the album five stars from Christian Review Magazine, Leah St. John says, "An extremely well produced live album".

Track listing

Charts

References

2015 live albums
Atlantic Records live albums
Word Records albums
Needtobreathe albums